Kevin Nicol (born 19 January 1982, in Kirkcaldy) is a Scottish former footballer.

He was the manager of Asker for five seasons. In 2020 he became player developer of Mjøndalen IF.

References

External links 
 100% Fotball (Norwegian Premier League statistics)
 

1982 births
Living people
Footballers from Kirkcaldy
Scottish footballers
Association football midfielders
Raith Rovers F.C. players
Hibernian F.C. players
Strømsgodset Toppfotball players
Peterhead F.C. players
FK Haugesund players
Mjøndalen IF players
Moss FK players
Frigg Oslo FK players
Asker Fotball players
Scottish Football League players
Scottish Premier League players
Scottish expatriate footballers
Expatriate footballers in Norway
Scottish expatriate sportspeople in Norway
Expatriate football managers in Norway
Scottish football managers
Mjøndalen IF non-playing staff